This list of solar eclipses visible from the Philippines enumerates the solar eclipse that have been and will be seen over the Philippines.

A solar eclipse occurs when the Moon passes between Earth and the Sun, thereby obscuring Earth's view of the Sun. Eclipses can be total, annular, or partial.

A total solar eclipse  occurs when the Moon's apparent diameter is larger than the Sun's, blocking all direct sunlight, turning day into darkness for a brief moment in time. While an annular solar eclipse occurs when the Moon's apparent diameter is smaller than the Sun's, blocking most of the Sun's light and causing the Sun to look like an annulus (ring). These central eclipses occurs only in a narrow path across Earth's surface. A partial solar eclipse, on the other hand, is visible over a surrounding region thousands of kilometres wide in areas where the non-central shadow falls.

Southeast Asia gets a moderate number solar eclipse events, however not every country will get to experience the same type of eclipse since the path of totality is only thin compared to the vastness of earth's surface. For example, a total solar eclipse from Indonesia may only appear as partial from the Philippines if the path of totality misses the archipelago.

Due to its location and relatively small size, a view of totality within the Philippines is a rare experience. There are only 7 recorded events from the last century in which the central path of solar eclipse crosses the official territory and predictions suggest that the frequency of occurrence will be the close to that amount for the 21st century.

Nineteenth century

Twentieth century

Total solar eclipses 
This lists the eclipses where the totality was visible from the Philippines.

Annular solar eclipses

Partial solar eclipses 
Solar eclipses that were seen from the Philippines where the moon partially covered the sun.

Twenty-first century

Total solar eclipses 
Total solar eclipses that are seen and will be seen on the archipelago.

Annular solar eclipses 
Annular solar eclipses where the annulus (ring) will be visible on some parts of the country.

Partial solar eclipses 
Solar eclipses visible as partial on the country for the 21st century

Twenty-second century

References

External Sources 
Solar and Lunar Eclipses in the Philippines by timaanddate.com

Solar eclipses
Philippines
Historical events in the Philippines